Dominic of Silos, O.S.B., (1000 – 20 December 1073) was a Spanish monk, to whom the Abbey of Santo Domingo de Silos, where he served as the abbot, is dedicated. He is revered as a saint in the Catholic Church. His feast day is 20 December.

Life
Born in Cañas, La Rioja, to a family of peasants, he worked as a shepherd before becoming a Benedictine monk at the Monasteries of San Millán de la Cogolla. He was ordained a priest and soon became master of novices and then prior, before being driven out with two of his fellow monks by King García Sánchez III of Navarre, for opposing his intention to annex the monastery's lands. 

Under the protection of King Ferdinand I of León, in 1041 they found refuge in the town of Silos at the decaying Abbey of St. Sebastian, occupied by only six monks. (After his death, both the monastery and the town were renamed for him.) Dominic was appointed as the abbot of the community and, inspired by the reforms of Cluny, proceeded to rebuild the monastery, both spiritually and physically. He built the cloisters in the Romanesque style, and established a scriptorium, turning the monastery into a center of book design, scholarship, and significant charity made possible through the proceeds of the gold and silver workshop. Dominic became known for works of healing. The monastery became one of the centers of the Mozarabic liturgy, and also preserved the Visigothic script of ancient Spain.

Wealthy patrons endowed the monastery, and Dominic raised funds to ransom Christians taken prisoner by the Moors. By the time of his death, on 20 December 1073, the monastery numbered forty monks.

Veneration
Dominic's relics were translated to the monastery church on 5 January 1076. Churches and monasteries were dedicated to him as early as 1085. His annual feast day is celebrated on 20 December.

Patronage
The mother of the better-known Saint Dominic of Guzmán, the Blessed Joan of Aza, is said to have prayed at his shrine before she was able to conceive the son she named for him. That son would grow up to found the Dominican Order. Dominic's special patronage thus became connected with pregnancy, and until the establishment of the Second Spanish Republic in 1931, his abbatial crozier was used to bless the queens of Spain, and was placed by their beds when they were in labor.

St. Dominic of Silos is patron saint of prisoners, pregnant women, and shepherds.

Legacy
The noted 13th-century priest and poet, Gonzalo de Berceo, wrote an account of his life.

In the 19th century Silos became a monastery in the Benedictine Congregation of Solesmes, and is notable for its fine double Romanesque cloisters, extensive library, and recordings of Gregorian chant.

See also
 Saint Dominic of Silos, patron saint archive

References

Spanish Roman Catholic saints
Spanish Benedictines
Benedictine abbots
Benedictine saints
1000 births
1073 deaths
11th-century Christian saints
Burials in the Province of Burgos
People from La Rioja